Curtis Edwin Lee (October 28, 1939 – January 8, 2015) was an American singer of the early 1960s, who was twice a beneficiary of Phil Spector's productions in 1961. These were "Pretty Little Angel Eyes" (US #7) and "Under the Moon of Love" (U.S. #46).

Career 
Born in Yuma, Arizona, Lee began his recording career in 1959. He traveled to New York in 1960 to cut a demo for Dunes Records. He wrote some songs with Tommy Boyce, in this period. Lee's first three singles were "Special Love", "Pledge of Love", and "Pretty Little Angel Eyes". In the UK, "Pretty Little Angel Eyes" was a minor hit record, peaking at No. 47 in 1961. "Pretty Little Angel Eyes" has been covered by Zombina and the Skeletones and Showaddywaddy.

Without Spector's influence, Lee's hits dried up. He went into the construction industry with his father in 1969. He died from cancer on January 8, 2015, in Yuma, Arizona, aged 75.

Singles

References

External links 
 Curtis Lee discography at the Rockin' Country Style website
 Soulful Kinda Music Entry
 [ Curtis Lee biography] at Allmusic

1939 births
2015 deaths
American male singer-songwriters
People from Yuma, Arizona
Singer-songwriters from Arizona